The Wilson–Chambers Mortuary, a former funeral home located in north Portland, Oregon, is listed on the National Register of Historic Places.

See also
 National Register of Historic Places listings in North Portland, Oregon

References

External links
 

1932 establishments in Oregon
Buildings and structures completed in 1932
Humboldt, Portland, Oregon
National Register of Historic Places in Portland, Oregon
North Portland, Oregon